The Fortuna Sittard Stadion is a 12,500-capacity multi-use stadium on the Milaanstraat, Sittard, Netherlands.  Currently used mostly for football matches, it is the home stadium of Fortuna Sittard. Built on the site of an industrial estate in 1999, it replaced Fortuna Sittard's former stadium, De Baandert.There is a multi-storey car park with 800 spaces under the stadium and two parking spaces in the immediate vicinity. 

In 2013, they began to expand the stadion with an extra sports centrum next to it, a new hotel, a Aldi-Nord discount supermarket in the stadium and a whole new look.

References

Football venues in the Netherlands
Sports venues in Limburg (Netherlands)
Buildings and structures in Sittard-Geleen
Fortuna Sittard